Acanoides is a genus of sheet weavers first described in 2014. , it contains only two species, both in China.

References

Linyphiidae
Araneomorphae genera
Spiders of China